Silvio Arturo Zavala Vallado (February 7, 1909 – December 4, 2014) was a Mexican historian who was considered to be a pioneer in law history studies and Mexico’s institutions.

Biography

Early life
Silvio Zavala was born on February 7, 1909, in Mérida, Yucatán. 
He studied at the National University of Mexico and at the University of Madrid, where he received a Ph.D. in Law.

Career
He began his professional career in Spain in the Center for Historic Studies in Madrid.

He has been a member of El Colegio Nacional since January 6, 1947, and of the Board of the Chronicle of Mexico City.  He received the 1969 National Literature Award; the Vasco de Quiroga Medal (1986); the Rafael Heliodoro Valle Award (1988); the Eligio Ancona Medal; and the Prince of Asturias Award. He served as Ambassador of Mexico in France from 1966 to 1975. 

He has written over sixty books and two hundred and fifty articles.  In May 2008, at the age of 99, the National Institute of Anthropology and History (INAH) bestowed upon him the Acknowledgment to a Lifetime Career to honor his work as a historian, scholar, researcher, thinker and cultural advocate. He died in Mexico City on December 5, 2014, at the age of 105.

Selected works

Las instituciones jurídicas en la conquista de América, Madrid, 1935.
La encomienda indiana, Madrid, 1935.
Fuentes para la historia del trabajo en Nueva España, México, 1939-1946.
Ideario de Vasco de Quiroga, México, 1941.
New Viewpoints on the Spanish Colonization of America, Philadelphia, University of Pennsylvania Press, 1943.
Ensayos sobre la colonización española en América, Buenos Aires, 1944.
La filosofía política en la conquista de América, México, 1947.
Aproximaciones a la historia de México, México, 1953.
Sir Thomas More in New Spain: A Utopian Adventure of the Renaissance, Londres, Canning House, 1955.
La defensa de los derechos del hombre en América Latina (siglos XVI-XVIII), París, Unesco, 1963.
Recuerdo de Vasco de Quiroga, México, D. F., Editorial Porrúa, 1965.
El Mundo Americano en la Época Colonial, México, Editorial Porrúa, 1968.
Orígenes de la colonización en el Río de la Plata, México, D. F., El Colegio Nacional, 1978.

See also 
 Mexican literature

References

External links
 Biography

1909 births
2014 deaths
Members of El Colegio Nacional (Mexico)
20th-century Mexican historians
Latin Americanists
Historians of Latin America
Mexican people of Basque descent
Mexican centenarians
Men centenarians
Ambassadors of Mexico to France